Jesse J may refer to:

 Jesse James, (1847–1882) an American outlaw and legendary figure of the Wild West
 Jessy J, (b. 1982) American jazz musician
 Jessie J, (b. 1988) English singer-songwriter